The 2022 Idaho Secretary of State election took place on November 8, 2022, to elect the next secretary of state of Idaho. Incumbent Republican Lawerence Denney was eligible to seek re-election but declined to run for a third term.

Republican primary
Phil McGrane won the Republican primary for Idaho Secretary of State on May 17, 2022.

Candidates

Nominee
Phil McGrane, Ada County clerk and candidate for Secretary of State in 2014

Eliminated in primary
Dorothy Moon, member of the Idaho House of Representatives from the 8th district (2016–)
Mary Souza, member of the Idaho Senate from the 4th district (2014–)

Withdrew
Chad Houck, chief deputy secretary of state

Endorsements

Results

Democratic primary

Candidates

Nominee
Shawn Keenan, mortgage broker

Results

General election

Predictions

Results

References

External links
Official campaign websites
Phil McGrane (R) for Secretary of State

Secretary of State
Idaho
Idaho Secretary of State elections